The Psycho Realm is an American hip hop group started in 1989 by brothers Sick Jacken (Joaquín Gonzalez) and Big Duke (Gustavo Gonzalez) from the Downtown, Pico-Union area of Los Angeles.

History 
The group members 1993 were sick jacken big duke and jojo making three songs/the realms on the set and is everybody in the house and later jojo left the group and
B-real join the group 1995 and 1997

The first recorded Psycho Realm song, "Scandalous," was released on the soundtrack of the film, Mi Vida Loca, in 1994. That same year B-Real of the rap group Cypress Hill saw Psycho Realm performing at Olvera Street for an End Barrio Warfare concert. Their performance inspired B-Real to the point that he wanted to join the group.

In 1997 Sony released the first Psycho Realm album, labelled as an addition to the Cypress Hill Family by the sticker placed on the CD case. Due to conflicts with the record label, the Gonzalez brothers were dropped from Sony. As Jacken explains, "the machine was just trying to censor me / Didn't do it for Sony so they ended up releasing me / Independent, no longer locked down for an infinity / So my vicinity stays true to my identity." The brothers then went on to form Sick Symphonies, their own record label, which lacked the big budget for promotion and distribution in chain stores along with group member B-Real, who was stuck on his contract with Sony for Cypress Hill.

Tragedy
At 12:35 a.m. on January 29, 1999, one month before the expected release of the second Psycho Realm album, Duke was shot in the neck in a confrontation while trying to split up a fight at Tommy's Burger Stand at Beverly and Rampart Boulevard in Los Angeles. This left him paralyzed from the neck down for life. The shooter, a 24-year-old named Robert Gorcsi, who was on parole at the time of the shooting, was given a bond set at $1.6 million. He was eventually jailed for attempted murder. Later in 2000, Jacken released A War Story Book I with B-Real only appearing on one song. In 2001, the Sick Symphonies label released The Steel Storm, the first album of a new group called Street Platoon. Jacken, with the help of Street Platoon, finished A War Story Book II, which was released in the latter half of 2003 and nearly complete before the shooting of Duke.

The group aims to inject pride and knowledge into those who live in gang-infested, poverty-ridden neighborhoods, while at the same time aiming to open the minds of the ones on the outside who look down upon them. Jacken attempts to explain to outsiders with his statement: "my people’s exodus results in prejudice / you ask us why in poverty we become terrorists/ well let me tell you this we don’t choose to tote gats / and selling on the corner is to avoid tax." Duke views the group not as rappers, but neighborhood reporters. They choose to document "a time when it's in fashion to be gun-flashing, blasting... strapped ready for rivals harassing." The Psycho Realm spoke about the corruption of Rampart police officers from their experiences living in the Rampart district, before the Rampart Scandal hit the media. The group also promotes the unification of gangs with remarks such as, "think about who dies when we let the lead out, we’re killing family tragically." The Psycho Realm has grown a worldwide following of "soldiers," and have performed in Mexico, Latin America, Japan, and Europe. At the moment, Duke is in charge of all merchandising for Psycho Realm. Duke is known to personally reply to many of his fans' emails, and is actively involved in a large percentage of production in Psycho Realm's and other affiliates' works.

Discography

Albums
And three songs of the 1993/the realms in the set/and/is everybody in the house/and/scandalous 
1997: The Psycho Realm
1998: Unreleased
1999: A War Story Book I
2003: A War Story Book II

Sick Jacken appearances
1999: Videodrone track "Pig In A Blanket" from the self-titled album.
2000: Delinquent Habits track "Midnite Spin" from the album Merry Go Round.
2003: Cartel De Santa track "Jake Mate" from the album Cartel de Santa.
2003: blink-182 track "The Fallen Interlude" from the album blink-182.
2004: RBX track "West Side Story" from the album The Shining.
2006: P.O.D. tracks "On the Grind" and "Mark My Words" from the album Testify.
2006: Swollen Members track "Sinister" from the album Black Magic.
2007: Evidence track "Born in LA" from the album The Weatherman LP.
2007: Cormega track "Live From The Caves" from the album Who Am I?.
2007: Delinquent Habits track "Sick Habits" from the album New and Improved
2008: Immortal Technique track "Hollywood Driveby" from the album The 3rd World.
2008: Snowgoons track "Sick Life" from the album Black Snow.
2008: DJ Babu track "Black and Brown Army" from the album Duck Season Vol. 3.
2008: OuterSpace track "Anointing of The Sick" from the album God's Fury.
2008: DJ Muggs vs. Planet Asia track "Death Frees Every Soul" from the album Pain Language.
2009: B-Real track "Psycho Realm Revolution" from the album Smoke N Mirrors.
2009: La Coka Nostra tracks "Brujeria", "Soldier's Story" and "Fuck Tony Montana" from the album A Brand You Can Trust.
2010: Vinnie Paz track "No Spiritual Surrender" from the album Season of the Assassin.
2010: Strong Arm Steady track "Pressure" from the album In Search of Stoney Jackson.
2010: DJ Muggs vs Ill Bill tracks "Trouble Shooters" and "Narco Corridos" from the album Kill Devil Hills.
2010: Q-Unique track "Between Heaven and Hell" from the album Between Heaven & Hell.
2010: Kemo The Blaxican track "The Gathering" from the album Upside of Struggle.
2010: HCP track "La verdad" from the album De las calles para las calles.
2010: MURS & 9th Wonder track "The Problem Is..." From the album Fornever
2011: OuterSpace track "Lost Angels" From the album My Brother's Keeper
2012: Adil Omar track "One by One" from the album The Mushroom Cloud Effect.
2012: P.O.D. track "Murdered Love" from the album Murdered Love.
2012: Bambu track "Th Eshit" from the album ...one rifle per family .
2016: La Coka Nostra tracks "I Need Help", and "High Times" from the album To Thine Own Self Be True.
2022: Madchild single “Work For It”, featuring Obnoxious

Psycho Realm presents Sick Symphonies
2005: Psycho Realm and Street Platoon Present... Sick Symphonies: Sickside Stories
2007: Sick Symphonies Presents DJ FM Street Mixes Vol.1

Sick Jacken albums
2006: Sick Jacken & Cynic - Terror Tapes Vol. 1
2007: DJ Muggs vs. Sick Jacken - Legend of the Mask and the Assassin
2009: Sick Jacken - Stray Bullets
2012: Sick Jacken & Cynic - Terror Tapes Vol. 2
2016: Sick Jacken - Psychodelic

References

External links
Sick Jacken Official website
Official Website
Psycho Realm Bio
Big Duke Interview
Psycho Realm Interview
Rapstage | Sick Jacken Interview
DJ FM interview

American rappers of Mexican descent
Hip hop groups from California
Musical groups established in 1989
Chicano rap
Hardcore hip hop groups
Musical groups from Los Angeles